This is a list of notable alumni of Yale Law School, the law school of the American Yale University, located in New Haven, Connecticut. (For a list of notable Yale University graduates, see the list of Yale University people.)  Records are kept by the Association of Yale Alumni.

All degrees listed below are LL.B. (the primary professional degree in law conferred by Yale Law School until 1971) or J.D. (the primary professional degree in law conferred since 1971), unless noted otherwise.

Yale Law's three–year J.D. (LL.B., prior to 1971) program enrolls an incoming class of approximately 200 students, one of the smallest incoming class sizes of all top law schools.

Law and government

United States government

Executive branch

U.S. Presidents
 Gerald Ford (1941), 38th President of the United States, 1974–1977
 Bill Clinton (1973), 42nd President of the United States, 1993–2001

U.S. Attorneys General
 Herbert Brownell Jr. (1927), 62nd U.S. Attorney General, 1953–1957
 Homer Stille Cummings (1893), 55th U.S. Attorney General, 1933–1939 
 Nicholas Katzenbach (1947), 65th U.S. Attorney General, 1965–1966 
 Peter Keisler (1985), acting U.S. Attorney General, 2007
 Edward H. Levi (1938), 71st U.S. Attorney General, 1975–1977 
 Wayne MacVeagh (1856), 36th U.S. Attorney General, 1881 
 Michael B. Mukasey (1967), 81st U.S. Attorney General, 2007–2009
 Edwards Pierrepont (1840), 33rd U.S. Attorney General, 1875–1876
 Alphonso Taft (1838), 34th U.S. Attorney General, 1876–1877

U.S. Solicitors General
 Drew S. Days, III (1966), 40th U.S. Solicitor General, 1993–1996
 Walter E. Dellinger III (1966), Acting Solicitor General, 1996–1997
 Neal Katyal (1995), Acting Solicitor General, 2010–2011
 Thomas D. Thacher (did not graduate), 21st U.S. Solicitor General, 1930–1933
 Seth P. Waxman (1977), 41st U.S. Solicitor General, 1997–2001

Other cabinet and cabinet-level officials
 Clifford Alexander Jr. (1958), 13th Secretary of the Army, 1977–1981
 Alex Azar (1991), 24th Secretary of Health and Human Services, 2018–2021
 John R. Bolton (1974), 25th U.S. Ambassador to the United Nations, 2005–2006
 John Bryson (1969), 37th Secretary of Commerce, 2011–2012
 Hillary Clinton (1973), 67th Secretary of State, 2009–2013
 Greg Craig (1972), 33rd White House Counsel, 2009–2010
 Lloyd Cutler (1939), 25th White House Counsel, 1994
 John Danforth (1963), 24th U.S. Ambassador to the United Nations, 2004–2005
 Richard Danzig (1971), 71st Secretary of the Navy, 1998–2001
 Henry H. Fowler (1932), 58th Secretary of the Treasury, 1965–1968
 Gordon Gray (1933), 2nd Secretary of the Army, 1949–1950
 Carla Anderson Hills (1958), 5th Secretary of Housing and Urban Development, 1975–1977
 John King Jr., Secretary of Education, 2015–2017
 Victor H. Metcalf (1876), 2nd Secretary of Commerce and Labor, 1904–1906; 38th Secretary of the Navy, 1906–1908
 Robert Reich (1973), 22nd Secretary of Labor, 1993–1997
 Stanley Rogers Resor (1942), 9th Secretary of the Army, 1965–1971
 Robert Rubin (1964), 70th Secretary of the Treasury, 1995–1999
 Gene Sperling (1985), Director of the National Economic Council, 1996–2000, 2011–2014
 Alphonso Taft (1838), 31st Secretary of War, 1876
 Cyrus Vance (1942), 57th Secretary of State, 1977–1980
 Christopher A. Wray (1992), 8th Director of the Federal Bureau of Investigation, 2017–present
 Eugene M. Zuckert (1936), 7th Secretary of the Air Force, 1961–1965
 Jake Sullivan (2003), 28th National Security Advisor, 2021-present

Legislative branch (U.S. Congress)

Senators
 Raymond E. Baldwin (1921), U.S. Senator (R-Connecticut), 1946–1949 
 Thomas F. Bayard, Jr. (1893), U.S. Senator (D-Delaware), 1922–1929 
 Michael Bennet (1993), U.S. Senator (D-Colorado), 2009–present 
 Richard Blumenthal (1973), U.S. Senator (D-Connecticut), 2011–present 
 Cory Booker (1997), U.S. Senator (D-New Jersey), 2013–present, 36th mayor of Newark, New Jersey, 2006–2013
 James L. Buckley (1950), U.S. Senator (R-New York), 1971–1977 
 Hillary Clinton (1973), U.S. Senator (D-New York), 2001–2009
 Chris Coons (1992), U.S. Senator (D-Delaware), 2010–present 
 John A. Danaher (1922), U.S. Senator (R-Connecticut), 1939–1945
 John Danforth (1961), U.S. Senator (R-Missouri), 1976–1995 
 David Davis (1835), U.S. Senator (R-Illinois), 1877–1883
 Thomas J. Dodd (1933), U.S. Senator (D-Connecticut), 1959–1971 
 Peter H. Dominick (1940), U.S. Senator (R-Colorado), 1963–1975 
 Charles Goodell (1951), U.S. Senator (R-New York), 1968–1971 
 Gary Hart (1964), U.S. Senator (D-Colorado), 1975–1987 
 Josh Hawley (2006), U.S. Senator (R-Missouri), 2019–present
Estes Kefauver (1927), U.S. Senator (D-Tennessee), 1949–1963
Alfred B. Kittredge, U.S. Senator (R-South Dakota), 1901–1909
 Joseph Lieberman (1967), U.S. Senator (D/I-Connecticut), 1989–2012 
 Augustine Lonergan (1902), U.S. Senator (D-Connecticut), 1933–1939 
 Brien McMahon (1927), U.S. Senator (D-Connecticut), 1945–1952
 Trusten Polk (1831), U.S. Senator (D-Missouri), 1857–1862 
 Julius Rockwell (1826), U.S. Senator (D-Massachusetts), 1854–1855 
 Arlen Specter (1956), U.S. Senator (D-Pennsylvania), 1981–2011 
 Paul Tsongas (1967), U.S. Senator (D-Massachusetts), 1979–1985
 Harris Wofford (1954), U.S. Senator (D-Pennsylvania), 1991–1995

Representatives
 Lewis Beach (1856), U.S. Representative (D-New York), 1881–1886 
 Carroll L. Beedy (1906), U.S. Representative (R-Maine), 1921–1935 
 Jackson Edward Betts (1929), U.S. Representative (R-Ohio), 1951–1973 
 Jonathan Brewster Bingham (1939), U.S. Representative (D-New York), 1965–1983 
 Clay Stone Briggs (1899), U.S. Representative (D-Texas), 1919–1933 
 C. Pope Caldwell (1899), U.S. Representative (D-New York), 1915–1921 
 Charles T. Canady (1979), U.S. Representative (R-Florida), 1993–2001 
 James Colgate Cleveland (1948), U.S. Representative (R-New Hampshire), 1963–1981 
 Sam Coppersmith (1982), U.S. Representative (D-Arizona), 1993–1995 
 Albert W. Cretella (1921), U.S. Representative (R-Connecticut), 1953–1959 
 Peter Deutsch (1982), U.S. Representative (D-Florida), 1993–2005 
 Allen Ertel (1965), U.S. Representative (D-Pennsylvania), 1977–1983 
 Elizabeth Esty (1985), U.S. Representative (D-Connecticut), 2013–2018 
 Richard P. Freeman (1894), U.S. Representative (R-Connecticut), 1915–1933 
 Peter Frelinghuysen Jr. (1941), U.S. Representative (R-New Jersey), 1953–1975 
 Foster Furcolo (1936), U.S. Representative (D-Massachusetts), 1949–1952 
 Edwin W. Higgins (1897), U.S. Representative (R-Connecticut), 1905–1913 
 Peter Hoagland (1968), U.S. Representative (D-Nebraska), 1989–1995 
 Colin M. Ingersoll, U.S. Representative (D-Connecticut), 1851–1855 
 Donald J. Irwin (1954), U.S. Representative (D-Connecticut), 1959–1961 
 Stephen Wright Kellogg (1848), U.S. Representative (R-Connecticut), 1869–1875 
Ro Khanna (2001), U.S. Representative (D-California), 2017–present
Franklin F. Korell (did not graduate), U.S. Representative (R-Oregon), 1927–1931 
 William Lemke, U.S. Representative (R-North Dakota), 1932–1936
 John Lindsay (1948), U.S. Representative (R-New York), 1959–1965 
 Dwight Loomis (1847), U.S. Representative (R-Connecticut), 1859–1863 
 Allard K. Lowenstein (1954), U.S. Representative (D-New York), 1969–1971 
 John Miller (1964), U.S. Representative (R-Washington), 1985–1993 
 Bruce Morrison (1973), U.S. Representative (D-Connecticut), 1983–1991 
 Eleanor Holmes Norton (1964), Congressional delegate (D-Washington, D.C.), 1991–present 
 Miner G. Norton (1880), U.S. Representative (D-Ohio), 1921–1923 
 George M. O'Brien (1947), U.S. Representative (R-Illinois), 1973–1986 
 Diane Pappas, U.S. Representative (D-Illinois), 2018–
 Tom Perriello (2001), U.S. Representative (D-Virginia), 2009–2011 
 Aaron F. Perry, U.S. Representative (R-Ohio), 1871–1872 
 William Scranton, U.S. Representative (D-Pennsylvania), 1961–1963 
 David Skaggs (1967), U.S. Representative (D-Colorado), 1987–1999 
 J. Joseph Smith (1927), U.S. Representative (D-Connecticut), 1935–1941 
 Wint Smith (1922), U.S. Representative (R-Kansas), 1947–1961 
 John Spratt (1969), U.S. Representative (D-South Carolina), 1983–2011 
 Joseph E. Talbot (1925), U.S. Representative (R-Connecticut), 1942–1947 
 Frank Tejeda (LL.M. 1989), U.S. Representative (D-Texas), 1993–1997 
 John Q. Tilson (1893), U.S. Representative (R-Connecticut), 1909–1913, 1915–1932
 William H. Upson (1845), U.S. Representative (R-Ohio), 1869–1873 
 Stuyvesant Wainwright (1947), U.S. Representative (R-New York), 1953–1961 
 Mel Watt (1970), U.S. Representative (D-North Carolina), 1993–present 
 Washington F. Willcox (1862), U.S. Representative (D-Connecticut), 1889–1893
 David Wu (1982), U.S. Representative (D-Oregon), 1999–2011 
 Dick Zimmer (1969), U.S. Representative (R-New Jersey), 1991–1997

Judicial branch

Supreme Court justices
 Samuel Alito (1975), Associate Justice, 2006–present
 Henry Billings Brown (did not graduate), Associate Justice, 1891–1906 
 David Davis (1835), Associate Justice, 1862–1877
 Abe Fortas (1933), Associate Justice, 1963–1969
 Brett Kavanaugh (1990), Associate Justice, 2018–present
 Sherman Minton (1916), (also graduated from Indiana University Maurer School of Law), Associate Justice, 1949–1956
 George Shiras Jr. (1853), Associate Justice, 1892–1903
 Sonia Sotomayor (1979), Associate Justice, 2009–present
 Potter Stewart (1941), Associate Justice, 1958–1981
 Clarence Thomas (1974), Associate Justice, 1991–present
 Byron White (1946), Associate Justice, 1962–1993

Federal Court judges

Federal courts of appeals
 Robert P. Anderson (1929), Judge for the U.S. Court of Appeals for the Second Circuit, 1964–1978 
 Herschel W. Arant (1915), Judge for the U.S. Court of Appeals for the Sixth Circuit, 1939–1941 
 Edward R. Becker (1957), Judge for the U.S. Court of Appeals for the Third Circuit, 1998–2003; Chief Judge of the U.S. Court of Appeals for the Third Circuit, 1998–2003 
 Duane Benton (1975), Judge for the U.S. Court of Appeals for the Eighth Circuit, 2004–present
 Stephanos Bibas (1994), Judge for the U.S. Court of Appeals for the Third Circuit, 2017–present 
 Wilbur F. Booth (1888), Judge for the U.S. Court of Appeals for the Eighth Circuit, 1925–1932 
 José A. Cabranes (1965), Judge for the U.S. Court of Appeals for the Second Circuit, 1994–present 
 Guido Calabresi (1958), Judge for the U.S. Court of Appeals for the Second Circuit, 1994–2009 
 Charles Edward Clark (1913), Judge for the U.S. Court of Appeals for the Second Circuit, 1939–1963 
 Eric L. Clay (1972), Judge for the U.S. Court of Appeals for the Sixth Circuit, 1997–present 
 Richard Clifton, Judge for the U.S. Court of Appeals for the Ninth Circuit, 2002–present 
 R. Guy Cole Jr. (1978), Judge for the U.S. Court of Appeals for the Sixth Circuit, 1995–present; Chief Judge of the U.S. Court of Appeals for the Sixth Circuit, 2014–2021 
 Steven Colloton (1988), Judge for the U.S. Court of Appeals for the Eighth Circuit, 2003–present
 Richard Cudahy (1955), Judge for the U.S. Court of Appeals for the Seventh Circuit, 1979–1994 
 Conrad K. Cyr (1956), Judge for the U.S. Court of Appeals for the First Circuit, 1989–1997 
 William A. Fletcher (1975), Judge for the U.S. Court of Appeals for the Ninth Circuit, 1998–present
 Susan P. Graber (1972), Judge for the U.S. Court of Appeals for the Ninth Circuit, 1998–present
 Morton Ira Greenberg (1957), Judge for the U.S. Court of Appeals for the Third Circuit, 1987–present 
 Pamela Harris (1990), Judge for the U.S. Court of Appeals for the Fourth Circuit, 2014–present 
 David Hamilton (1983), Judge for the U.S. Court of Appeals for the Seventh Circuit, 2009–present 
 A. Leon Higginbotham Jr. (1952), Judge for the U.S. Court of Appeals for the Third Circuit, 1977–1993
 Stephen A. Higginson (1987), Judge for the U.S. Court of Appeals for the Fifth Circuit, 2011–present 
 Carroll C. Hincks, Judge for the U.S. Court of Appeals for the Second Circuit, 1954–1964 
 Andrew D. Hurwitz (1972), Judge for the U.S. Court of Appeals for the Ninth Circuit, 2012–present 
 Robert Katzmann (1980), Judge for the U.S. Court of Appeals for the Second Circuit, 1999–2020 
 Carolyn Dineen King (1962), Judge for the U.S. Court of Appeals for the Fifth Circuit, 1979–2013 
 Kermit Lipez (1967), Judge for the U.S. Court of Appeals for the First Circuit, 1998–2011 
 Scott Matheson Jr. (1980), Judge for the U.S. Court of Appeals for the Tenth Circuit, 2010–present 
 William Ernest Miller (1933), Judge for the U.S. Court of Appeals for the Sixth Circuit, 1970–1976 
 Jon O. Newman (1956), Judge for the U.S. Court of Appeals for the Second Circuit, 1979–1997 
 Barrington Daniels Parker Jr. (1969), Judge for the U.S. Court of Appeals for the Second Circuit, 2001–2009 
 Cornelia (Nina) T.L. Pillard (1983), Judge for the U.S. Court of Appeals for the District of Columbia Circuit, 2013–present
 Jill A. Pryor (1988), Judge for the U.S. Court of Appeals for the Eleventh Circuit, 2012–present
 Stephen Reinhardt (1954), Judge for the U.S. Court of Appeals for the Ninth Circuit, 1980–2018
 Roger Robb (1931), Judge for the U.S. Court of Appeals for the District of Columbia Circuit, 1969–1982 
 Oliver Seth (1940), Judge for the U.S. Court of Appeals for the Tenth Circuit, 1962–1984; Chief Judge of the U.S. Court of Appeals for the Tenth Circuit, 1977–1984 
 Richard G. Taranto (1981), Judge for the U.S. Court of Appeals for the Federal Circuit, 2013–present
 Albert Tate Jr. (1947), Judge for the U.S. Court of Appeals for the Fifth Circuit, 1979–1986 
 William H. Timbers, Judge for the U.S. Court of Appeals for the Second Circuit, 1971–1981
 William Kneeland Townsend, Judge for the U.S. Court of Appeals for the Second Circuit, 1902–1907
 Patricia Wald (1951), Judge for the U.S. Court of Appeals for the District of Columbia Circuit, 1979–1999; Chief Judge of the U.S. Court of Appeals for the District of Columbia Circuit, 1986–1991
 George Thomas Washington (1932), Judge for the U.S. Court of Appeals for the District of Columbia Circuit, 1949–1965 
 Ralph Winter (1960), Judge for the U.S. Court of Appeals for the Second Circuit, 1981–2020

Federal district courts
 Ronnie Abrams (1993), Judge for the U.S. District Court for the Southern District of New York, 2012–present
 William Acker (1952), Judge for the U.S. District Court for the Northern District of Alabama, 1982–1996
 Roy Altman (2007), Judge for the U.S. District Court for the Southern District of Florida, 2019–present
 Cecilia Altonaga (1986), Judge for the U.S. District Court for the Southern District of Florida, 2003–present
 Harold Baer Jr. (1957), Judge for the U.S. District Court for the Southern District of New York, 1994–2014
 David Barlow, Judge for the U.S. District Court for the District of Utah, 2020–present
 James E. Boasberg (1990), Judge for the U.S. District Court for the District of Columbia, 2011–present
 Paul D. Borman (LL.M. 1964), Judge for the U.S. District Court for the Eastern District of Michigan, 1994–present
 Howard C. Bratton (1947), Judge for the U.S. District Court for the District of New Mexico, 1964–1987; Chief Judge of the U.S. District Court for the District of New Mexico, 1978–1987
 Philip A. Brimmer (1985), Judge for the U.S. District Court for the District of Colorado, 2008–present
 Ellen Bree Burns (1923), Judge for the U.S. District Court for the District of Connecticut, 1978–1992; Chief Judge of the U.S. District Court for the District of Connecticut, 1988–1992
 Edward N. Cahn (1958), Judge for the U.S. District Court for the Eastern District of Pennsylvania, 1974–1998
 Charles Hardy Carr (1926), Judge for the U.S. District Court for the Southern District of California, 1962–1966; Judge for the U.S. District Court for the Central District of California, 1966–1973
 Paul Charlton, Judge for the U.S. District Court for the District of Puerto Rico, 1911–1913
 Frank C. Damrell Jr. (1964), Judge for the U.S. District Court for the Eastern District of California, 1997–2008
 Joseph A. Diclerico Jr. (1966), Judge for the U.S. District Court for the District of New Hampshire, 1992–2007; Chief Judge of the U.S. District Court for the District of New Hampshire, 1992–1997
 Jan DuBois (1957), Judge for the U.S. District Court for the Eastern District of Pennsylvania, 1988–2002
 Warren William Eginton (1951), Judge for the U.S. District Court for the District of Connecticut, 1979–1992
 David A. Faber (1967), Judge for the U.S. District Court for the Southern District of West Virginia, 1991–2008
 Eldon E. Fallon (LL.M. 1963), Judge for the U.S. District Court for the Eastern District of Louisiana, 1995–present
 A. Joe Fish (1968), Judge for the U.S. District Court for the Northern District of Texas, 1983–2007; Chief Judge of the U.S. District Court for the Northern District of Texas, 2002–2007
 Dabney L. Friedrich (1992), Judge for the U.S. District Court for the District of Columbia, 2017–present
 Jesse Furman (1998), Judge for the U.S. District Court for the Southern District of New York, 2012–present
 Nina Gershon (1965), Judge for the U.S. District Court for the Eastern District of New York, 1996–2008
 Nancy Gertner (1971), Judge for the U.S. District Court for the District of Massachusetts, 1994–2011
 Gerhard Gesell (1935), Judge for the U.S. District Court for the District of Columbia, 1967–1993
 James Tyrone Giles (1967), Judge for the U.S. District Court for the Eastern District of Pennsylvania, 1979–2008
 Charles Haight (1955), Judge for the U.S. District Court for the Southern District of New York, 1976–1995
 Jean Constance Hamilton (LL.M. 1982), Judge for the U.S. District Court for the Eastern District of Missouri, 1990–present; Chief Judge of the U.S. District Court for the Eastern District of Missouri, 1990–present, 1995–2002
 A. Andrew Hauk (1942), Judge for the U.S. District Court for the Southern District of California, 1966; Judge for the U.S. District Court for the Central District of California, 1966–1982; Chief Judge of the U.S. District Court for the Central District of California, 1980–1982
 Truman McGill Hobbs (1948), Judge for the U.S. District Court for the Middle District of Alabama, 1980–1991; Chief Judge of the U.S. District Court for the Middle District of Alabama, 1984–1991
 Marvin Katz (1954), Judge for the U.S. District Court for the Eastern District of Pennsylvania, 1983–2010
 Bruce William Kauffman (1959), Judge for the U.S. District Court for the Eastern District of Pennsylvania, 1997–2009
 Samuel Pailthorpe King (1940), Judge for the U.S. District Court for the District of Hawaii, 1972–1984
 John A. Kronstadt (1976), Judge for the U.S. District Court for the Central District of California, 2011–present
 Morris E. Lasker (1941), Judge for the U.S. District Court for the Southern District of New York, 1968–1983
 Victor Marrero (1968), Judge for the U.S. District Court for the Southern District of New York, 1999–2010
 Frank Hampton McFadden (1955), Judge for the U.S. District Court for the Northern District of Alabama, 1969–1982
 Richard Wellington McLaren (1942), Judge for the U.S. District Court for the Northern District of Illinois, 1972–1976
 Louis F. Oberdorfer (1946), Judge for the U.S. District Court for the District of Columbia, 1977–present
 James Francis Thaddeus O'Connor (1909), Judge for the U.S. District Court for the Southern District of California, 1940–1949
 J. Paul Oetken (1991), Judge for the U.S. District Court for the Southern District of New York, 2011–present
 Jill Parrish (1985), Judge for the U.S. District Court for the District of Utah, 2015–present
 James Perry Platt (1875), Judge for the U.S. District Court for the District of Connecticut, 1902–1913
 Thomas Collier Platt Jr. (1950), Judge for the U.S. District Court for the Eastern District of New York, 1974–2001
 Louis H. Pollak (1948), Judge for the U.S. District Court for the Eastern District of Pennsylvania, 1978–1991
 Michael Ponsor (1975), Judge for the U.S. District Court for the District of Massachusetts, 1994–2011
 Michael Shea (1993), Judge for the U.S. District Court for the District of Connecticut, 2012–present
 Oliver Perry Shiras (1856), Judge for the U.S. District Court for the Northern District of Iowa, 1882–1903
 Dominic J. Squatrito (1965), Judge for the U.S. District Court for the District of Connecticut, 1994–2004
 Leonard P. Stark (1996), Judge for the U.S. District Court for the District of Delaware, 2010–present
 Edwin DeHaven Steel Jr. (1931), Judge for the U.S. District Court for the District of Delaware, 1958–1969
 Sidney Stein (1969), Judge for the U.S. District Court for the Southern District of New York, 1995–2010
 Richard J. Sullivan (1990), Judge for the U.S. District Court for the Southern District of New York, 2007–2019; 
 Robert Sweet (1948), Judge for the U.S. District Court for the Southern District of New York, 1978–1991
 Robert Taylor (1924), Judge for the U.S. District Court for the Eastern District of Tennessee, 1950–1984; Chief Judge of the U.S. District Court for the Eastern District of Tennessee, 1961–1969
 Charles Henry Tenney (1936), Judge for the U.S. District Court for the Southern District of New York, 1963–1979
 Edwin Stark Thomas (1895), Judge for the U.S. District Court for the District of Connecticut, 1913–1939
 Alvin Thompson (1978), Judge for the U.S. District Court for the District of Connecticut, 1994–present
 Myron H. Thompson (1972), Judge for the U.S. District Court for the Middle District of Alabama, 1980–1998; Chief Judge of the U.S. District Court for the Middle District of Alabama, 1991–1998
 Stefan R. Underhill (1982), Judge for the U.S. District Court for the District of Connecticut, 1999–present
 William H. Walls (1957), Judge for the U.S. District Court for the District of New Jersey, 1994–2005
 Henry Travillion Wingate (1972), Judge for the U.S. District Court for the Southern District of Mississippi, 1985–present; Chief Judge of the U.S. District Court for the Southern District of Mississippi, 2003–present
 Caleb Merrill Wright (1933), Judge for the U.S. District Court for the District of Delaware, 1955–1973; Chief Judge of the U.S. District Court for the District of Delaware, 1957–1973
 William H. Yohn Jr. (1960), Judge for the U.S. District Court for the Eastern District of Pennsylvania, 1969–1980
 Robert Carmine Zampano (1954), Judge for the U.S. District Court for the District of Connecticut, 1964–1994

Other courts
 Gary S. Katzmann (1979), Judge for the United States Court of International Trade, 2016–present
J. Rich Leonard (1976), U.S. Bankruptcy Judge for the Eastern District of North Carolina, 1992–present
 Albert Levitt (1923), Judge for the District Court of the Virgin Islands, 1935–1968
 Lyman E. Munson (1851), Justice of the Territorial Montana Supreme Court
 William Josiah Tilson (1896, LL.M. 1897), Judge for the United States Court of International Trade

State government

Governors
 Jerry Brown (1964), 34th and 39th Governor of California, 1975–1983, 2011–2019 
 Foster Furcolo (1936), 60th Governor of Massachusetts, 1957–1961 
 Bibb Graves (1896), 38th Governor of Alabama, 1927–1931
 Henry Baldwin Harrison, 52nd Governor of Connecticut, 1885–1887
 William W. Hoppin, 24th Governor of Rhode Island, 1854–1857
 William J. Mills (1877), 19th Governor of New Mexico Territory, 1910–1912
 Gina Raimondo (1998), 75th Governor of Rhode Island, 2015–2021, United States Secretary of Commerce 2021–present.
 Raymond P. Shafer (1941), 39th Governor of Pennsylvania, 1967–1971

State politicians
 Peter H. Behr (1940), member of the California State Senate, 1970–1978
 Asa S. Bloomer (1916), member of the Vermont House of Representatives, 1937–1945, and Speaker of the House, 1943–1945; member of the Vermont Senate, 1947–1963, and President Pro Tem, 1949, 1955, 1959–1963
 Rob Bonta (1998), Attorney General of California, 2021–present
 James M. Brown (1967), Attorney General of Oregon, 1980–1981
 Eliphalet Adams Bulkeley (1824), Connecticut State Senator, 1838–1840, Connecticut State Representative, 1834–1838
 John A. Busterud (1949), California State Assembly, 1956–1962
 Kimberly B. Cheney (1964), Attorney General of Vermont, 1973–1975
 Robert E. Cooper Jr. (1983), Attorney General of Tennessee, 2006–2014
 Robert Del Tufo (1958), Attorney General of New Jersey, 1990–1993
 Nelson Antonio Denis (1980), member of the New York State Assembly from the 68th district, 1997–2001
 Matthew Denn (1991), lieutenant governor of Delaware, 2009–present
Tilton E. Doolittle (1846), Speak of the House of the Connecticut House of Representatives, and US Attorney for the district of Connecticut 
 John R. Dunne (1954), member of the New York Senate from the 6th district, 1966–1989
 Daniel C. Esty (1986), commissioner of the Connecticut Department of Energy and Environmental Protection, 2011–2014
 Shirley Adele Field, member of the Oregon House of Representatives, 1956–1960, 1962–1966
 Tom Foley, Secretary of Labor and Industry of Pennsylvania, 1991–1994
 Ammi Giddings, member of the Connecticut Senate, 1858–1864
 Harrison Goldin (1960), member of the New York Senate, 1966–1973
 Cyrus Habib, 16th Lieutenant Governor of Washington, former State Senator from Washington state, 2014–2016, former member of the Washington House of Representatives, 2012–2014
 L. W. Housel (1900), member of the Connecticut House of Representatives, 1900–1902
 Michael Johnston, member of the Colorado Senate from the 33rd district, 2009–present
 Daniel Kagan, member of the Colorado House of Representatives, 2009–present
 Jeff King, member of the Kansas Senate from the 15th district, 2011–present
 Kris Kobach (1995), 31st Secretary State of Kansas, 2001–present
 John Latta (1859), 1st Lieutenant Governor of Pennsylvania, 1875–1879
 Frederick Lippitt (1946), member of the Rhode Island House of Representatives, 1961–1983
 J. Edward Meyer (1961), member of the Connecticut Senate, 2005–present
 Robert W. Naylor (1969), member of the California State Assembly for the 20th district, 1978–1986; chair of the California Republican Party, 1987–1989
 Charles R. Nesbitt (1947), 9th Attorney General of Oklahoma, 1963–1967; Secretary of Energy of Oklahoma, 1991–1995
 Larry Obhof, President of the Ohio Senate from 2017 to 2020, State Senator for the 22nd district, 2011–2020
 Edwin Archer Randolph, the first African-American to graduate from the law school, Randolph served in both houses of the Virginia Legislature
 James Paull, president of the West Virginia Senate, 1943–1945
 Jamie Pedersen, member of the Washington House of Representatives from the 43rd district, 2007–present
 Charles B. Perry, Speaker of the Wisconsin State Assembly, 1929
 Stephen Sachs, Attorney General of Maryland, 1979–1987
 Shirley Adelson Siegel (1941), Solicitor General of New York, 1979–1982
 Bryan Townsend, member of the Delaware Senate, 2012–present
 Francis W. Treadway (1892), 30th Lieutenant Governor of Ohio, 1909–1911
 Ralph E. Van Norstrand (1961), minority leader of the Connecticut General Assembly, 1979–1985; Speaker of the Connecticut House of Representatives, 1985—1987
 Anthony Van Wyck (1844), member of the Wisconsin State Senate 1864–1865, 1868–1869
 John Wesley Wescott, Attorney General of New Jersey, 1914–1919

State judges
 William B. Chandler III, Chancellor, Delaware Court of Chancery, 1985–1996
 John M. Comley (1920), Associate Justice of the Connecticut Supreme Court, 1963–1965
 Rick Haselton, Chief Judge, Oregon Court of Appeals, 2012–present; Judge, Oregon Court of Appeals, 1994–2012
 Ernest A. Inglis, Chief Justice, Connecticut Supreme Court, 1953–1957; Associate Justice, Connecticut Supreme Court, 1950–1953
 Jeffrey W. Johnson (1985), Judge, California Court of Appeal, 2009–present
 Hans A. Linde (1966), Justice, Oregon Supreme Court, 1977–1990; correspondent for CBS Evening News
 Goodwin Liu (1998), Associate Justice, California Supreme Court, 2011–present
 William M. Maltbie (1905), Chief Justice, Connecticut Supreme Court, 1930–1950; Judge, Connecticut Supreme Court, 1925–1930
 Monica Márquez (1997), Associate Justice, Colorado Supreme Court, 2010–present
 Margaret H. Marshall, Chief Justice, Massachusetts Supreme Judicial Court, 1999–2010 (first woman to hold this position); Associate Justice, Massachusetts Supreme Judicial Court, 1996–1999
 Marshall F. McComb (1919), Associate Justice, California Supreme Court, 1955–1977
 Walter Myers Jr. (1938), Associate Justice, Indiana Supreme Court, 1963-1967
 George W. Wheeler (1883), Chief Justice, Connecticut Supreme Court, 1920–1930
 J. Craig Wright (1954), Associate Justice, Ohio Supreme Court, 1985–1996

City government
 Jane Bolin (1931), judge for the New York City Domestic Relations Court, 1939–1979; also the first African–American woman to serve as a judge in the United States
 Richard Buery (1997), former deputy mayor of New York City 
 George Williamson Crawford (1903), second black graduate of the Law School and Corporation Counsel of the City of New Haven
 David Hansell (1983), commissioner of the New York City Administration for Children's Services
 Bruce Harris, mayor of Chatham Borough, New Jersey, 2012–present
 Robert J. Harris, mayor of Ann Arbor, Michigan, 1969–1973
 John Lindsay (1948), 103rd mayor of New York City, New York, 1966–1973
 Robert M. Morgenthau (1948), New York County District Attorney, 1975–2009
 Charles Phelps Taft II (1921), mayor of Cincinnati, Ohio, 1955–1957

U.S. diplomatic figures
 Winthrop G. Brown (1930), 16th U.S. Ambassador to South Korea, 1964–1967
 William Smith Culbertson (1910), president of the United States Tariff Commission, 1922–1925
 Richard N. Gardner (1951), U.S. Ambassador to Spain, 1993–1997; U.S. Ambassador to Italy, 1977–1981
 Ulric Haynes (1956), 6th U.S. Ambassador to Algeria, 1977–1981
 David Huebner (1986), 17th U.S. Ambassador to New Zealand, 2009–present
 Eugene M. Locke (1940), 9th U.S. Ambassador to Pakistan, 1966–1967
 Robert McCallum Jr. (1973), 23rd U.S. Ambassador to Australia, 2006–2009
 John O'Leary (1969), 48th U.S. Ambassador to Chile, 1998–2001
 Sargent Shriver (1941), 44th U.S. Ambassador to France, 1968–1970; also the driving force behind the Peace Corps
Gerard C. Smith (1938), Chief Delegate to the Strategic Arms Limitation Talks and Director, Arms Control and Disarmament Agency, 1969–1972 
 R. Douglas Stuart Jr. (1946), 22nd U.S. Ambassador to Norway, 1984–1989
 Peter Tufo, U.S. Ambassador to Hungary, 1997–2001

Other U.S. political figures
 Mark D. Agrast (1985), Deputy Assistant Attorney General for the Office of Legislative Affairs of the United States Department of Justice, 2009–present
 Meade Alcorn, chairman of the Republican National Committee, 1957–1959
 Dillon Anderson (1929), 2nd National Security Advisor, 1955–1956
 Joe Andrew (1985), chairman of the Democratic National Committee, 1999–2001
 Michael Barr (1992), Assistant Secretary for Financial Institutions of the U.S. Department of the Treasury
 Rubén Berríos (1961), Puerto Rico senator at large, 1972–1976, 1984–1988, 1993–1996
 Matthew Berry, Republican primary challenger in Virginia's 8th congressional district election, 2010
 Boris Bershteyn (2004), Associate White House Counsel, 2010–present
 William L. Borden (1947), executive director of United States Congress Joint Committee on Atomic Energy, 1949–1953
 Beth Brinkmann (1985), Assistant to the U.S. Solicitor General, 1993–2001
 Antonia Handler Chayes (did not graduate), 14th Under Secretary of the Air Force, 1979–1981
 William Thaddeus Coleman III, 17th General Counsel of the Army, 1994–1999
 Mathea Falco (1968), 1st Assistant Secretary of State for International Narcotics and Law Enforcement Affairs, 1979–1981
 Roswell Gilpatric (1931), Deputy Secretary of Defense, 1961–1964
 Fred T. Goldberg Jr. (1973), Commissioner of Internal Revenue, 1989–1992
 Stephen Hadley (1972), 21st National Security Advisor, 2005–2009
 Coleman Hicks (1968), General Counsel of the Navy, 1979–1981
 Steven S. Honigman (1973), General Counsel of the Navy, 1993–1998
 Jerry MacArthur Hultin (1972), 27th Under Secretary of the Navy, 1997–2000
 Reed Hundt (1974), chairman of the Federal Communications Commission, 1993–1997
 Rashad Hussain (2005), 2nd Special Envoy to the Organisation of the Islamic Conference, 2010–present
 Harrison Loesch (1939), Assistant Secretary of the Interior, 1969–1972
 Malcolm A. MacIntyre, 5th Under Secretary of the Air Force, 1957–1959
 Burke Marshall (1951), Assistant Attorney General for the Civil Rights Division of the United States Department of Justice, 1961–1964
 Joe Miller (1995), Republican Senate candidate from Alaska, 2010
 Roderic L. O'Connor (1947), 2nd Assistant Secretary of State for Security and Consular Affairs, 1957–1958
 Stephen A. Oxman, 19th Assistant Secretary of State for European and Canadian Affairs, 1993–1994
 Troy A. Paredes, commissioner of the Securities and Exchange Commission, 2008–2013
 Michael Pertschuk (1959), chairman of the Federal Trade Commission, 1977–1981
 Randal Quarles (1984), 15th Under Secretary for Domestic Finance, 2005–2006
 Eugene Rostow (1937), Under Secretary of State for Political Affairs, 1966–1969
 Kevin K. Washburn (1993), 12th Assistant Secretary of Indian Affairs for the U.S. Department of the Interior, 2012–2015
 Neal S. Wolin, Deputy Secretary of the Treasury, 2009–present
 R. James Woolsey Jr. (1968), 16th Director of the Central Intelligence Agency, 1993–1995
 Adam Yarmolinsky, political appointee who served in numerous capacities in the Kennedy, Johnson and Carter administrations
 David Yassky, member of the New York City Council from the 33rd District, 2002–2009

Non-United States government

Non-United States political figures

Heads of state or heads of government
 Karl Carstens (LL.M. 1949), 5th President of Germany, 1979–1984
 Jose P. Laurel (J.S.D. 1920), 3rd President of the Philippines, 1943–1945
 Salvador Laurel (J.S.D. 1960), 10th Vice President of the Philippines, 1986–1992; 5th Prime Minister of the Philippines, 1986
 Peter Mutharika (LL.M., J.S.D.), President of the Republic of Malawi, 2014–present; former Minister of Foreign Affairs of Malawi, 2011–2012

Other political figures
 Ron Atkey (LL.M. 1966), member of the House of Commons of Canada, 1972–1974, 1979–1980
 Kwesi Botchwey (LL.M.), Minister of Finance of Ghana, 1982–1995
 Irwin Cotler (LL.M. 1966), Minister of Justice of Canada, 2003–2006
 Wan Exiang (LL.M. 1987), Vice Chairman of the Standing Committee of the National People's Congress of the People's Republic of China, 2013–present
 Francisco Afan Delgado (LL.M. 1909), Senator of the Philippines, 1951–1957
 Philip S. Deloria, founder and 1st Secretary-General of the World Council of Indigenous Peoples
 Eoghan Fitzsimons (LL.M. 1966), Attorney General of Ireland, 11 November to 15 December 1994
 David Howarth (LL.M. 1983), Member of Parliament for Cambridge, 2005–2010
 S. Jayakumar (LL.M. 1966), Senior Minister of Singapore, 2009–2011
 Antonio La Viña, Undersecretary of the Department of Environment and Natural Resources of the Philippines
 Stavros Lambrinidis (1988), Member of the European Parliament, 2004–2009; Vice President of the European Parliament, 2009–2011; 23rd Minister for Foreign Affairs of Greece, 2011; European Union Special Representative for Human Rights, 2012–present
 Jovito Salonga (J.S.D. 1949), 14th President of the Senate of the Philippines, 1987–1992
 Lebbeus R. Wilfley (1892), 1st Attorney General of the Philippines, 1901–1906
 Michael Yaki, commissioner on the United States Commission on Civil Rights, 2005–2016

Non-United States judicial figures

International court judges
 Rosalyn Higgins (J.S.D. 1962), English judge, 1995–2009, and president, 2006–2009, of the International Court of Justice
 Philip Jessup (1924), American judge for the International Court of Justice, 1961–1970
 Shigeru Oda (J.S.D. 1953), Japanese judge for the International Court of Justice, 1976–2003
Ksenija Turkoviç, Croatian judge at the European Court of Human Rights 2015–present

National court judges
 Luís Roberto Barroso (LL.M. 1989), Judge for the Supreme Court of Brazil, 2013–present
 Leo Barry (LL.M. 1968), Justice for the Supreme Court of Newfoundland and Labrador, 2007–present
 Daryl Dawson (LL.M. 1956), Justice of the High Court of Australia, 1982–1997
 Todd Ducharme (LL.M. 1991), Judge for the Ontario Superior Court of Justice
 Enrique Fernando (1948), Chief Justice of the Supreme Court of the Philippines
 Stephan Harbarth (LL.M. 2000), President of the Federal Constitutional Court of Germany, 2020–present
 Gérard La Forest (LL.M. 1965), Puisne Justice of the Supreme Court of Canada, 1985–1997
 Johnnie Lewis (LL.M. 1971), 18th Chief Justice of Liberia, 2006–present
 Cecilia Muñoz-Palma (LL.M. 1954), first woman appointed to the Supreme Court of the Philippines

International organization figures
 Stavros Lambrinidis (J.D. 1988), European Union Special Representative for Human Rights (since 2012)
 Johan C. Verbeke (LL.M. 1978), head of the United Nations Observer Mission in Georgia (UNOMIG)
 Josefina Phodaca-Ambrosio (LL.M. 1957), first Asian and only Filipino to become President of Federacion Internacional de Abogadas

Notable attorneys
 Floyd Abrams (1960), attorney at Cahill Gordon & Reindel who has had a substantial influence on constitutional law in the United States through the argument of important cases
 Douglas Arant (1923), attorney in Birmingham, Alabama
 Michael F. Armstrong, attorney
 Francis N. Bangs (1847), founding partner of Bangs & Stetson, a precursor to the modern firm of Davis, Polk & Wardwell
 Thomas D. Barr (1931–2008), prominent lawyer at Cravath, Swaine & Moore
 Bouvier Beale,  attorney and first cousin of Jacqueline Kennedy Onassis and Lee Radziwill
 Dana Berliner, public interest attorney at the Institute for Justice
 Hunter Biden, founding partner of Oldaker, Biden & Belair, LLP; son of President Joe Biden
 David Boies (1966), chairman of Boies, Schiller & Flexner
 Ralph Cavanagh, environmental attorney and co–director of the Air/Energy Program at the Natural Resources Defense Council
 William Coblentz (1947), attorney and power broker who played an important role in California politics in the years after World War II
 Julien Davies Cornell, attorney noted for his defense of Ezra Pound following Pound's indictment for treason
 J. Richardson Dilworth (1942), attorney for the Rockefeller family
 Tali Farhadian (born 1974 or 1975), former US federal prosecutor
 Peter E. Fleming Jr. (1958), criminal defense attorney
 Bob Giuffra (1987), partner, Sullivan & Cromwell
 Charles Halpern (1964), co-founder of the Center for Law and Social Policy, the first public interest law firm in the United States
 Whitfield Jack (1932), attorney in his native Shreveport, Louisiana; United States Army colonel in World War II under General Matthew Ridgway, and United States Army Reserve major general
 David Kendall (1971), attorney who advised President Bill Clinton during the Lewinsky scandal and Clinton's subsequent impeachment proceedings
 George Kern (1952), partner of Sullivan & Cromwell
 Ernest Knaebel (1896, LL.M. 1897), 11th Reporter of Decisions of the Supreme Court, 1916–1944
 Arthur Kramer, founding partner of Kramer Levin
 Dawn Johnsen (1986), attorney twice nominated by President Barack Obama to head the Office of Legal Counsel
 Mark I. Levy (1975), appellate attorney who argued 16 cases before the Supreme Court
 Arthur Mag, legal counsel to Harry S. Truman
 Bessie Margolin (1933), labor attorney who argued numerous cases before the Supreme Court
 Arvo Mikkanen (1986), attorney nominated by President Barack Obama to the U.S. District Court for the Northern District of Oklahoma
Ann Olivarius (1986), Chair of McAllister Olivarius, plaintiff in Alexander v. Yale, and notable sexual harassment lawyer
 Jesselyn Radack (1995), ethics adviser to the Department of Justice who disclosed that the FBI committed an ethics violation in their interrogation of John Walker Lindh
 Robert Raymar (1972), attorney nominated by President Bill Clinton to the U.S. Court of Appeals for the Third Circuit
 Stephen Shulman (1958), attorney most notable for representing Egil Krogh during the Watergate scandal
 John Thomas Smith (1901), first general counsel and a director of General Motors, 1910 – 1947
 Paul M. Smith (1979), attorney at Jenner & Block who argued many notable cases including Lawrence v. Texas
 Leonard Weinglass (1958), notable criminal defense attorney and constitutional law advocate
 Andrea R. Wood (1998), senior counsel for the United States Securities and Exchange Commission
 Gregory Howard Woods (1995), general counsel of the United States Department of Energy
 Arnold M. Zack (1956), notable arbitrator and mediator of labor management disputes

Public policy leaders
 Deborah Archer (1996), President of the American Civil Liberties Union and Professor at NYU School of Law, Archer is the first African-American to lead the ACLU.
John P. Hannah, senior fellow at the Washington Institute for Near East Policy
 Carla Anderson Hills, 5th chairwoman of the Council on Foreign Relations
 Bruce J. Katz (1985), vice president of the Brookings Institution
 Bayless Manning (1949), 1st president of the Council on Foreign Relations
Krish O'Mara Vignaraja, President and CEO of Lutheran Immigration and Refugee Service, former Senior  Policy Director to Michelle Obama

Academia

University presidents and other administrators
 Michelle Anderson (born 1967), President of Brooklyn College, and a scholar on rape law
 Nancy Y. Bekavac (1973), president of Scripps College, 1990–2007
 Alfred Benjamin Butts (1930), chancellor of the University of Mississippi, 1935–1946
 Gerhard Casper (LL.M. 1962), president of Stanford University, 1992–2000
 Hiram Chodosh (1990), president of Claremont McKenna College, 2013–present
Ronald J. Daniels (1988), president of Johns Hopkins University, 2009–present
 JoAnne A. Epps (1976), provost Temple University, 2016-2021
 William R. Greiner, president of the University at Buffalo, 1991–2004
 Robert S. Harrison, chairman of the Cornell University Board of Trustees 
 Ira Michael Heyman (1956), chancellor of the University of California, Berkeley, 1980–1990
 Robert Hutchins (1925), president of the University of Chicago, 1929–1945; chancellor of the University of Chicago, 1945–1951
 Joseph S. Iseman (1941), acting president of Bennington College, 1976
 Thomas H. Jackson (1975), president of University of Rochester, 1994–2005
 Marvin Krislov (1988), president of Oberlin College, 2007–present
 Ted Landsmark (1973), president of the Boston Architectural College, present
 Frederick M. Lawrence (1980), president of Brandeis University, 2011–present
 Edward H. Levi (1938), president of the University of Chicago, 1968–1975
 Wallace Loh, president of the University of Maryland, College Park, 2010–present
 Linda Lorimer, vice president of Yale University; president of Randolph-Macon Woman's College, 1986–1993
 Cyrus Northrop, president of the University of Minnesota, 1884–1911
 Russell K. Osgood (1974), president of Grinnell College, 1998–2010
 Louis H. Pollak (19433), federal judge and dean of Yale Law School and the University of Pennsylvania Law School
 Ariel Porat (1990), president of Tel Aviv University
 Robert Prichard (LL.M. 1976), president of the University of Toronto, 1990–2000
 Michael H. Schill (1984), president of the University of Oregon, 2015–
 Clayton Spencer (1985), president of Bates College, 2012–present
 Stephen Joel Trachtenberg (1962), president of George Washington University, 1988–2007
 Louis Vogel (LL.M. 1982), president of Panthéon-Assas University, 2006–2012
 Nora Demleitner (1992), president of St. John's College - Annapolis, 2022–present

Legal academia

Law school deans
 T. Alexander Aleinikoff (1977), dean of Georgetown University Law Center, 2004–2009
 Nicholas Allard (1979), Dean and President of Brooklyn Law School
 Michelle Anderson (1994), dean of City University of New York Law School, 2006–2016
 Evan Caminker (1986), dean of the University of Michigan Law School, 2003–2013
 Nora Demleitner (1992), dean of the Washington and Lee University School of Law, 2012–2015
 John Hart Ely (1963), dean of Stanford Law School, 1982–1987
 JoAnne A. Epps (1976) dean of Temple Law School, 2008- 2016
 Robert Klonoff (1979), dean of Lewis & Clark Law School, 2007–2014
 Anthony T. Kronman (1975), dean of Yale Law School, 1994–2004
 Saul Levmore (1980), dean of the University of Chicago Law School, 2001–2009
 Paul Mahoney (1984), dean of the University of Virginia School of Law, 2008–2016
 Earl F. Martin (LL.M. 1996), dean of Gonzaga University School of Law, 2005–2010
 Michael Meltsner (JD 1960), dean of Northeastern University School of Law, 1979–1984 
 Martha Minow (1979), dean of Harvard Law School, 2009–present
 Jennifer Mnookin (1995), dean of UCLA Law School, 2015—present
 Russell D. Niles (LL.M. 1931), dean of New York University School of Law, 1948–1963
 Robert Post (1977), dean of Yale Law School, 2009–2017
 Wendell Pritchett, Chancellor of Rutgers University–Camden, Interim Dean and Presidential Professor at the University of Pennsylvania Law School, and Provost of the University of Pennsylvania
 Norman Redlich (1950), dean of New York University School of Law, 1974–1988
 Richard Revesz (1983), dean of New York University School of Law, 2002–2013
 Michael H. Schill (1984), dean of UCLA Law School (2004–2009) and University of Chicago Law School (2010–2015)
 David Schizer (1993), dean of Columbia Law School, 2004–2014
 Aviam Soifer (1972), dean of the William S. Richardson School of Law, 2003–present 
 William Treanor (1985), dean of Georgetown University Law Center, 2010–present
 Frans Vanistendael (LL.M.), dean of Katholieke Universiteit Leuven, 1999–2005
 Kevin K. Washburn (1993), dean of the University of New Mexico School of Law, 2009–2012
 Joan Wexler, Dean and President of Brooklyn Law School
 Thomas C. Athur, Dean of Emory Law School, 2002-2005

Legal scholars

Constitutional law
 Bruce Ackerman (1967), professor at Yale Law School and author of Social Justice in the Liberal State, 1987–present; regarded as one of the most frequently cited legal academics in the United States
 Akhil Amar (1984), professor at Yale Law School
 Vikram Amar (1988), professor at the University of California Davis School of Law
 C. Edwin Baker, professor at the University of Pennsylvania Law School, 1981–present; considered one of the country's foremost authorities on the First Amendment
 Charles Black, professor at Yale Law School, 1956–1987
 Philip Bobbitt (1975), professor at Columbia Law School and author of The Shield of Achilles: War, Peace, and the Course of History, 2007–present
 Noah Feldman (1997), professor at Harvard Law School, 2007–present; scholar on Islamic law and the intersection of religion and politics
 Paul W. Kahn (1980), professor at Yale Law School
 Kermit Roosevelt III (1997), professor at the University of Pennsylvania Law School, 2002–present
 Reva Siegel (1986), professor at Yale Law School, 1994–present
 Carol M. Swain (M.S.L. Law), Professor of Political Science and Law at Vanderbilt University
 Charles Alan Wright (1949), professor at University of Texas School of Law, 1995–2000; considered to be one of the foremost authorities in the United States on constitutional law
 Kenji Yoshino (1996), professor at New York University School of Law, 2006–present; focused on anti-discrimination law, civil and human rights law, and law and literature

Criminal law
 Barbara Babcock (1963), professor at Stanford Law School, 1972–present
 Alan Dershowitz (1962), professor at Harvard Law School, 1964–present; also a prolific attorney, jurist, and legal commentator and author of The Case for Israel
 Don Kates, professor at Saint Louis University School of Law and author of numerous books on gun control
 Mark Osler (1990), professor at the University of St. Thomas School of Law, clemency advocate, and critic of capital punishment

Civil and human rights law
 David D. Cole (1984), professor at Georgetown University Law Center
 Lani Guinier (1974), professor at Harvard Law School, 2001–present; also the first tenured female African–American professor at Harvard Law School and well-known civil rights activist
 Christof Heyns (LL.M.), professor at the Institute for International and Comparative Law in Africa at the University of Pretoria
 Randall Kennedy (1982), professor at Harvard Law School
 Andrew Koppelman (1989), professor at Northwestern University, 2007–present
 Catharine MacKinnon (1977), professor at the University of Michigan Law School, 1989–present; feminist scholar focused on sexual harassment and pornography
 Tobias Barrington Wolff (1997), professor at the University of Pennsylvania Law School; notable for his legal advocacy on same-sex marriage and other LGBT-related issues

Intellectual property
 Lori Andrews, professor at Chicago–Kent College of Law
 Susan P. Crawford, professor at the Benjamin N. Cardozo School of Law
 Lawrence Lessig, professor at Harvard Law School, 2008–present; professor at Stanford Law School, 2000–2008, where he founded its Center for Internet and Society, candidate for the Democratic Party's nomination for president in the 2016 U.S. presidential election
 Eben Moglen (1985), professor at Columbia Law School and founder of the Software Freedom Law Center
 Ryan Abbott, professor at the University of Surrey School of Law

International law
 Harold J. Berman (1947), professor at Harvard Law School, 1948–1985; professor at Emory Law School, 1985–2007
 George Bermann (1971), professor at Columbia Law School, 1975–present
 Rosa Brooks (1996), professor at Georgetown University Law Center, 2011–present
 Steve Charnovitz (1998), professor at George Washington University Law School, 2004–present
 Jerome Cohen (1955), professor at New York University School of Law, 1990–present
 Jack Goldsmith (1989), professor at Harvard Law School; also head of the Office of Legal Counsel 2003–2004
 David O'Keeffe (LL.M. 1978), Professor of European Law at University of Durham, 1990–1993; professor of European Law at University College London 1993–2005;, emeritus professor of European Law at University of London 2005–present; part-time European administrative law judge
 John Yoo (1992), professor at the University of California, Berkeley, School of Law, 1993–present; primarily known for authoring the Torture Memos

Jurisprudence
 Peter Berkowitz, professor at George Mason University School of Law, 1999–2007; senior fellow at Stanford University's Hoover Institution, 2007–present
 Jules Coleman (1976), professor at Yale Law School
 Arthur Corbin (1899), professor at Yale Law School and one of the progenitors of legal realism
 Jan Deutsch (1962), professor at Yale Law School
 Richard Epstein (1968), professor at New York University Law School, 2010–present; considered one of the most influential legal thinkers in the United States
 Duncan Kennedy (1970), professor at Harvard Law, 1976–present; founder of the critical legal studies movement
 Karl Llewellyn, professor at Columbia Law School, 1925–1951; professor at the University of Chicago Law School, 1951–1962; leading proponent of legal realism

Other legal scholars
 Matthew Adler (1991), law professor
 Ian Ayres (1986), professor at Yale Law School and the Yale School of Management, 1994–present
 David C. Baldus (1964, LL.M. 1969), professor at the University of Iowa College of Law
 Boris Bittker (1941), professor at Yale Law School, 1946–2005
 Peter A. Bradford (1964), professor at Vermont Law School and former member of the U.S. Nuclear Regulatory Commission
 Tomiko Brown-Nagin, professor at Harvard Law School
 Stephen Carter, professor at Yale Law School, 1982–present
 John C. Coffee (1969), professor at Columbia Law School
 Arthur Linton Corbin (1899), professor at Yale Law School, 1903–1943
 Omar Dajani, professor at McGeorge School of Law at the University of the Pacific
 Harlon L. Dalton, professor at Yale Law School
 Stuart L. Deutsch (1969), professor at Rutgers School of Law–Newark, 1999–2009
 Bill Dodge (1991), professor at the University of California, Hastings College of the Law
 Elizabeth Emens (2002), professor at Columbia Law School, 2005–present
 Cynthia Estlund (1983), professor at New York University School of Law
 Bill Felstiner (1958), professor at Cardiff University, 1995–2005; specializes in law and sociology
 Claire Finkelstein (1993), professor at the University of Pennsylvania Law School
 Nicole Garnett (1995), professor at Notre Dame Law School, 1999–present
 Richard Garnett (1995), professor at Notre Dame Law School, 1999–present
 Michael Gottesman, professor at Georgetown University Law Center
 Daniel Halberstam, professor at the University of Michigan Law School
 Clarence Halbert (1897), co–founder of William Mitchell College of Law
 Kermit L. Hall, legal historian and member of the Assassination Records Review Board
 Philip Hamburger (1982), professor at Columbia Law School
 Samuel Issacharoff (1983), professor at New York University School of Law
 Brian Kalt (1997), professor at Michigan State University College of Law
 Michael I. Krauss (LL.M. 1978), professor at George Mason University School of Law, 1987–present
 Ethan Leib (2003), professor at Fordham Law School
 Louis Loss (1937), professor at Harvard Law School, considered the intellectual father of modern securities law
 Jonathan R. Macey (1982), professor at Yale Law School
 Robert T. Miller (1997), professor at the University of Iowa College of Law
 Eric L. Muller (1987), professor at the University of North Carolina School of Law
 H. Jefferson Powell (1982), professor at George Washington University School of Law, 2010–present
 Jedediah Purdy (2001), professor at Duke University Law School
 Charles A. Reich (1952), professor at Yale Law School and author of The Greening of America
 Glenn Reynolds, professor at the University of Tennessee College of Law
 Deborah Rhode (1977), professor at Stanford Law School
 Daniel Richman (1984), Paul J. Kellner Professor of Law at Columbia Law School
 Fred Rodell, professor at Yale Law School
 Joel Rogers, professor at the University of Wisconsin Law School
 Chris William Sanchirico (1994), professor at the University of Pennsylvania Law School
 Brett Scharffs (1992), professor at the J. Reuben Clark Law School of Brigham Young University, 1997–present
 Wesley Alba Sturges (1923), professor at Yale Law School
 Eleanor Swift, professor at the UC Berkeley School of Law
 Donald F. Turner (1950), professor at Harvard Law School
 Mark Tushnet, professor at Harvard Law School
 Steven Walt (1988), professor at the University of Virginia School of Law
 Matthew Waxman, professor at Columbia Law School
Rivka Weill, professor at Harry Radzyner Law School, Interdisciplinary Center
 Mark S. Weiner, professor at Rutgers School of Law–Newark
 Charles Whitebread, professor at the University of Southern California Law School
 Steven Wilf, professor at the University of Connecticut School of Law
 Michael Wishnie, professor at Yale Law School
 Theodore Salisbury Woolsey, professor at Yale Law School
 Katra Zajc (LL.M.), professor at the University of Ljubljana

Other scholars
 Peter Berkowitz, professor of political science at Harvard University, 1990–1999
 Scott Boorman (1978), professor of sociology at Yale University
 Lawrence Douglas (1989), professor at Amherst College
 Murray Gerstenhaber (1948), mathematician and lawyer, professor at the University of Pennsylvania
 Austin Sarat (1988), professor of political science at Amherst College
 Ian Shapiro (1987), professor of political science at Yale University
 Ruth Wedgwood, professor of international relations at the School of Advanced International Studies at Johns Hopkins University
 Michael Woodford, professor of economics at Columbia University
 Kyu Ho Youm (M.S.L.), professor of journalism at the University of Oregon

Activism
 Jasper Alston Atkins (1922), civil rights activist and the first black editor of the Yale Law Journal
 D'Army Bailey (1967), civil rights activist and founder of the National Civil Rights Museum
 Mark Barnes (1984), attorney and AIDS activist
 Craig Becker, labor attorney and a member of the National Labor Relations Board, 2010–2011
 Cornell William Brooks, civil rights activist, attorney, and former President & CEO, NAACP
 Kathleen Neal Cleaver, prominent member of the Black Panther Party
 Bill Drayton (1970), founder of Ashoka: Innovators for the Public, a global social entrepreneurship organization
 Marian Wright Edelman (1963), president and founder of the Children's Defense Fund
 Robert Gnaizda, co-founder of the Greenlining Institute
 Seth Green, founder of Americans for Informed Democracy
 Michael Harrington, chairman of Democratic Socialists of America, 1982–1989
 Kenneth Hecht, public interest attorney and advocate for improved access to affordable, nutritious food
 Louis Clayton Jones, civil rights activist and founder of the National Conference of Black Lawyers
 Van Jones (1993), environmental activist, civil rights activist, and attorney; founder of Green For All
 Henry T. King (1943), prosecutor at the Nuremberg trials, 1946–1947
 Gay McDougall, civil rights activist and executive director of Global Rights, 1994–2006
 Michael Meltsner, civil rights litigator First Asst.Counsel NAACP Legal Defense Fund, 1961–1970
 Creighton Miller, founder of the National Football League Players Association labor union
 Lisa Richette, child welfare activist
 Catherine Roraback (1948), civil rights attorney best known for representing the plaintiffs in the landmark 1965 Supreme Court case Griswold v. Connecticut
 Kenneth Roth (1980), executive director of Human Rights Watch, 1993–present
 Linda Rottenberg, founder of Endeavor
 Andrew Shapiro, founder of GreenOrder, an environmental sustainability consulting firm
 James Speth (1969), attorney and environmental activist
 Gregory Stanton, founder and president of Genocide Watch, 1999–present
 R. Douglas Stuart Jr. (1946), founder of the America First Committee, the foremost non-interventionist pressure group against the American entry into World War II, while a student at Yale Law
 Neera Tanden (1996), president of the Center for American Progress, 2011–present
 William Taylor (1954), civil rights activist
 Maxim Thorne, senior vice president of the NAACP

Business
 Lon Babby (1976), President of the Phoenix Suns
 Jeff Ballabon, senior vice president of CBS News; also an Orthodox Jewish lobbyist and the founder of Coordinating Council on Jerusalem
 Alfred Wellington Carter (1893), prominent landowner in Hawaii
 Dick Cass (1971), president of the Baltimore Ravens from 2004 to 2022
 Sam Cohn (1956), co-founder of International Creative Management and talent agent to Paul Newman, Woody Allen, and Meryl Streep, among others
 E. Virgil Conway (1956), chairman and CEO of the New York State Metropolitan Transportation Authority
 Michael R. Eisenson (1981), co-founder, managing director, and CEO of Charlesbank Capital Partners, a private equity investment firm based in Boston and New York City
 Charles E. Fraser,  real estate developer
 Arthur Frommer (1953), publisher of Frommer's travel guidebook series
 Tom Glocer, CEO of Thomson Reuters and Reuters
 Najeeb Halaby (1940), businessman and father of Queen Noor of Jordan
 Joel Hyatt, co-founder of Current TV with Al Gore
 Eli Jacobs (1964), financier and owner of the Baltimore Orioles, 1989–1993
 William M. Jennings, executive in the National Hockey League and president of the New York Rangers
 Victor S. Johnson, Jr., president of Aladdin Industries
 John Koskinen, non-executive chairman of Freddie Mac, 2008–2011
 Michael E. Levine (1965), airline executive
 Larry Lucchino (1971), president and CEO of the Boston Red Sox
 J. Howard Marshall (1931), oil magnate, known for his marriage to Anna Nicole Smith
 Mark McCormack, founder of IMG, an international sports and media company
 Nicolas D. Muzin (1975), Politico and founder of Stonington Global.
 Neal Pilson (1963), former president of CBS Sports
 Robert Pozen (1972, J.S.D. 1973), vice chairman and president of Fidelity Investments
 Ken Stern, CEO of National Public Radio
 John Butler Talcott (1846), industrialist and founder of the New Britain Museum of American Art
 Brooks Thomas, CEO of Harper & Row
 Raymond S. Troubh, independent financial consultant who served as a general partner at Lazard, 1961–1974; interim chairman of Enron, 2002–2004
 Hubertus van der Vaart, Dutch businessman and co-founder and chairman of SEAF
 Fay Vincent (1963), 8th Commissioner of Major League Baseball, 1989–1992
 John P. Wheeler III (1975), chairman of the Vietnam Veterans Memorial Fund
 Tim and Nina Zagat (1966), co-founders and publishers of Zagat
 John E. Zuccotti (1963), real estate developer and namesake of Zuccotti Park

Film, theater, and television
 Lisa Bloom (1986), anchor of Lisa Bloom: Open Court on Court TV
 Katy Chevigny, documentary filmmaker.
 La Carmina, Canadian fashion blogger, author, journalist, and host on CNNGo
 Jeff Greenfield (1967), senior political correspondent for CBS Evening News
 Yul Kwon (2000), host of American Revealed on PBS and winner of Survivor: Cook Islands
 D. G. Martin, host of North Carolina Bookwatch on UNC-TV
 Gene Sperling (1985), writer on The West Wing
 Ben Stein (1970), actor and host of Win Ben Stein's Money

Writers
 Renata Adler (1979), novelist, staff writer for The New Yorker, and film critic for The New York Times
 Joseph Amiel (1962), attorney and writer of popular fiction
 Aditi Banerjee, co-author and editor of Invading the Sacred
 Chesa Boudin (2011), progressive writer
 Lan Cao, author of the 1997 novel Monkey Bridge and 2014 novel The Lotus and the Storm (Viking)
 Stephen Carter (1979), novelist
 Ken Chen, poet
 Nelson Denis (1980), editorial director of El Diario/La Prensa, author of War Against All Puerto Ricans (Nation Books, 2015)
 Heidi W. Durrow (1995), novelist
 Robin Goldstein (2002), food and wine critic
 Adam Haslett (2003), short story writer
 Julie Hilden (1992), novelist
 Laura Chapman Hruska, novelist and co-founder and editor-in-chief of Soho Press
 Jamil Jivani (2013), author of Why Young Men
 Bruce Judson (1984), author of business and public policy books
 Edward Lazarus (1987), author of the 1998 non-fiction book Closed Chambers
 He Li (2003), Chinese-language poet
 Walter Lord (1948), author of the 1955 book A Night to Remember, considered a definitive account of the Titanic disaster
 Daniyal Mueenuddin (1996), short story writer
 David Orr (1999), poet
 Matthew Pearl, novelist
 Daniel Pink, author
 Gretchen Rubin (1995), author of the 2009 book The Happiness Project
 David Stewart (1978), non-fiction writer
 Alina Tugend (M.S.L.), columnist for The New York Times
 J. D. Vance (2013), author of Hillbilly Elegy
 Qian Julie Wang (2012), author of  Beautiful Country
 Clement Wood, poet
 Elizabeth Wurtzel (2008), author of the 1994 memoir Prozac Nation
 Monica Youn, poet

Media and journalism

Commentators
 Michael Barone (1969), conservative political analyst, pundit, and journalist; principal author of The Almanac of American Politics
 Lanny Davis (1970), political commentator and author of Scandal: How "Gotcha" Politics Is Destroying America
 Van Jones (1993), political analyst for CNN
 Jonathan Kay (1997), editor-in-chief of The Walrus
 Mark Levine, progressive political pundit and radio host

Journalists
 Emily Bazelon (2000), staff writer, The New York Times Magazine, former senior editor of Slate
 Bob Cohn, executive editor of Wired, 2001–2008
 Nelson Antonio Denis (1980), editorial director of El Diario/La Prensa, former member of the New York State Assembly
 Ronan Farrow (2009), contributor to The New Yorker and Pulitzer Prize winner
 Craig Forman, foreign correspondent and bureau chief for The Wall Street Journal
 Jack Fuller, Pulitzer Prize–winning journalist and president of the Tribune Company
 Linda Greenhouse (M.S.L. 1978), Supreme Court correspondent for The New York Times
 Patrick Radden Keefe, staff writer for The New Yorker, appointed as a Guggenheim Fellow in 2006
 David Lat (1999), founder and managing editor of Above the Law, a blog about the legal profession
 Adam Liptak (1988), Supreme Court correspondent for The New York Times
 Victor Navasky (1959), editor of The Nation, 1978–1995; publisher of The Nation, 1995–2005; chairman of the Columbia Journalism Review, 2005–present
 Viveca Novak (M.S.L.), political correspondent for Time
 Charlie Savage (2003), reporter for The New York Times
 Luiza Savage, Washington bureau chief, Maclean's magazine

Military
 Alfred Terry, general of the Union Army during the American Civil War

Sports

 Rodney Aller, masters skier
 Al Hessberg (1941), college football player
 William G. Norton, college football coach
 Fay Moulton, Olympic sprinter and college football player
 Jim O'Rourke (1887), Major League Baseball player and manager
 Tom Shevlin (1906), four-year track star (broke school record in hammer throw); All-American end and captain; post-grad volunteer coach of football team
 Ted St. Germaine (1914), professional football player in the National Football League

Other
 T. Bill Andrews, abstract impressionist painter, author, federal ALJ
 Dyke Brown (1941), founder of The Athenian School
 John Anthony Flood,  sociologist, legal academic, consultant, author and a researcher
 Richard Green (1987), psychiatrist specializing in homosexuality and transsexualism
 Stewart Rhodes (2004), founder of the Oath Keepers, convicted for seditious conspiracy in the January 6 United States Capitol attack
 Pat Robertson (1955), televangelist and founder of Regent University
 Vanessa Selbst (2012), professional poker player
 Sherman Day Thacher (1886), founder of The Thacher School
 Iwan Tirta (1964), fashion designer
 Louis W. Tompros, academic and lawyer
 Yona Reiss (1991), Chief Rabbinical judge of the Chicago Rabbinical Council

Non-graduates
These students attended Yale Law but, for various reasons, did not graduate.

 Judah P. Benjamin, Secretary of State of the Confederate States; U.S. Senator from Louisiana
 Henry Billings Brown, Associate Justice of the Supreme Court of the United States, 1890–1906
 Henry Louis Gates, professor of history at Harvard University
 Alexander T. Hawthorn, Confederate States Army general
 Michael Medved, author, film critic, and radio talk show host
 David Milch (expelled), television writer and producer
 Robert B. Silvers, co-founder and editor of The New York Review of Books

Fictitious alumni
 Arthur Branch, character on the TV series Law & Order
 Alexis Davis, character on the TV series General Hospital
 Greg Foster, character on the TV series The Young and the Restless
 Amy Gardner, character on the TV series The West Wing
 Judge Chamberlain Haller, character in the film My Cousin Vinny
 Josh Lyman, character on the TV series The West Wing
 Jordan McDeere, character on the TV series Studio 60 on the Sunset Strip
 Selina Meyer, character on the TV series Veep
 Wayne Palmer, character on the TV series 24
 Bruce Wayne, alter ego of Batman, as disclosed in 
Detective Comics 439
  Rory Gilmore, character on the TV series Gilmore Girls

References

Yale Law School people
Yale Law School

Law School alumni